Ramadan is the ninth month of the Islamic calendar, and the month in which the Quran is believed to be revealed to the Islamic prophet Muhammad.

Fasting during the month of Ramadan is one of the Five Pillars of Islam. The month is spent by Muslims fasting during the daylight hours from dawn to sunset. According to Islam, the Quran was sent down to the lowest heaven during this month, thus being prepared for gradual revelation by Jibreel  to Muhammad. Therefore, Muhammad told his followers that the gates of Heaven would be open for the entire month and the gates of Hell (Jahannam) would be closed. The first three days of the next month, Shawwal, are spent in celebration and are observed as the "Festival of Breaking Fast" or Eid al-Fitr.

Timing
The Islamic calendar is a lunar one: months begin when the first crescent of a new moon is sighted. Consequently, the Islamic year is 10 to 11 days shorter than the solar year and contains no intercalation, Ramadan migrates throughout the seasons. The Islamic day starts after sunset. The estimated start and end dates for Ramadan, based on the Umm al-Qura calendar of Saudi Arabia, are:

Many Muslims insist on the local physical sighting of the moon to mark the beginning of Ramadan, but others use the calculated time of the new moon or the Saudi Arabian declaration to determine the start of the month. Since the new moon is not in the same state at the same time globally, the beginning and ending dates of Ramadan depend on what lunar sightings are received in each respective location. As a result, Ramadan dates vary in different countries, but usually only by a day. This is due to the cycle of the moon. Astronomical projections that approximate the start of Ramadan are available.

Events

Ramadan is observed by Muslims during the entire lunar month by the same name. The month of religious observances consists of fasting and extra prayers. Some important historical events during this month are generally believed to include:
 2 Ramadan, the Torah was bestowed on Moses according to Islam.
 10 Ramadan, death of Khadija bint Khuwaylid, the wife of Muhammad.
 12 Ramadan, the Gospel was bestowed on Jesus according to Islam.
 15 Ramadan, birth of Hasan ibn Ali.
 17 Ramadan, birth of Ibn ʿArabi. 
 17 Ramadan, death of Aisha bint Abu Bakr – a wife of Muhammad.
 17 Ramadan, the Battle of Badr was won by the Muslims.
 18 Ramadan, the Psalms (Zabur) were bestowed on David (Dawood).
 19 Ramadan, Imam Ali struck on the head during prayer by Abd al-Rahman ibn Muljam with a poisoned sword.
 20 Ramadan, the Conquest of Mecca by Muhammad.
 21 Ramadan, Caliph Ali martyred.

Laylat al-Qadr is observed during one of the last ten days of the month (typically the odd nights). Muslims believe that this night which is also known as "The Night of Power" is better than a thousand months. This is often interpreted as praying throughout this night is rewarded equally with praying for a thousand months (just over 83 years i.e., a lifetime). Many Muslims spend the entire night in prayer.

Hadith

Prohibition to pronounce the word Ramadan by itself
According to numerous hadiths Ramadan is one of the names of God in Islam, and as such it is prohibited to say only "Ramadan" in reference to the calendar month and that it is necessary to say the "month of Ramadan".

Sunni

Shia

Zaydi

See also

Islamic holy books
19 Ramadan
21 Ramadan
23 Ramadan

Notes

References

External links
 Islamic-Western Calendar Converter (Based on the Arithmetical or Tabular Calendar)
 The Umm al-Qura Calendar of Saudi Arabia
 Predicting the First Visibility of the Lunar Crescent (with lunar crescent visibility maps to 2024)

Fasting in Islam
9